"Beat Mama" is the a song by Liverpool Britpop band Cast, fronted by ex La's bassist John Power. Released on 26 April 1999, the song peaked at number nine on the UK Singles Chart, becoming the band's seventh and final UK top-10 hit.

Track listings

UK CD1
 "Beat Mama"
 "Get on You"
 "3 Nines Are 28"

UK CD2
 "Beat Mama"
 "Hoedown"
 "Whisky Song"

UK 7-inch jukebox vinyl
A. "Beat Mama" (radio edit)
B. "Get on You"

European CD single
 "Beat Mama" (radio edit)
 "Get on You"
 "Hoedown"
 "Whisky Song"

Credits and personnel
Credits are lifted from the UK CD1 and Magic Hour liner notes.

Studios
 Recorded at Ridge Farm Studio (West Sussex, England) and Air Studios Lyndhurst (Hampstead, London)
 Mixed at The Church (London, England)
 Mastered at Gateway Mastering (Portland, Maine, US)

Cast
 John Power – writing, vocals, guitar
 Liam Tyson – guitar
 Peter Wilkinson – bass guitar
 Keith O'Neill – drums

Production
 Gil Norton – production, mixing
 Danton Supple – engineering, mixing
 Bob Ludwig – mastering

Charts

References

1999 singles
1999 songs
Cast (band) songs
Music videos directed by Howard Greenhalgh
Polydor Records singles
Song recordings produced by Gil Norton
Songs written by John Power (musician)